Sara Vukčević (born 25 March 1992) is a Montegerin handballer who plays for Csurgói NKC.

International honours 
EHF Champions League:
Semifinalist: 2011

EHF Cup:
Semifinalist: 2015

European Championship:
Winner: 2012

References

1992 births
Living people
Sportspeople from Podgorica
Montenegrin female handball players
Expatriate handball players
Montenegrin expatriate sportspeople in Hungary
Montenegrin expatriate sportspeople in Romania